This Piece Has No Title Yet is a postminimalist conceptual sculpture installation by Cady Noland created in 1989. The piece has been cited as Noland's breakthrough work, with art dealer and curator Jeffrey Deitch calling it "her masterpiece, her greatest work."

Artwork
This Piece Has No Title Yet is a room-sized installation made of several component parts. 1,100 six-packs of Budweiser beer are stacked together, lining the walls of the room. In front of the beer cans are rows of metal scaffolding draped with American flags and Budweiser promotional banners, keeping the stacked cans against the walls. Scattered across the room are cardboard boxes and wooden crates filled with Coca-Cola cans, tools, cleaning supplies, magazines, and American flags. Tools and equipment are littered on the floor, placed where the artist last used them when constructing the piece. A pair of handcuffs and several seatbelts hang from one portion of the scaffolding.

History
The work was first installed at The Mattress Factory in Pittsburgh from October to December, 1989. Elaine Dannheisser purchased the work after it was shown and subsequently donated it to the Museum of Modern Art. The piece was included in the 1991 Whitney Biennial. Don & Mera Rubell purchased the piece from MoMA in 1996 for the Rubell Museum where it is currently located.

Reception
This Piece Has No Title Yet has been hailed by several critics as a landmark work of conceptual and postminimalist art. Writing in Artforum, critic Jeffrey Kastner called the sculpture "show-stopping" and "a real-life experience a hundred times more potent than any postgrad seminar on the artifactual narratives of American abjection." Upon seeing the sculpture for the first time, former San Francisco Museum of Modern Art curator John Caldwell called the piece "jaw-dropping."

Discussing the beer can motif in the work, critic Lane Relyea wrote that Noland presents "an image of overwhelming intoxication and, at the same time, incredible waste, the whole mighty edifice destined to be chugged and pissed away; and, behind that, another image, that of the eroded canyons of the American West."

Conversely, writing in 1991, critic Arthur Danto described the piece as an "intolerable and patronizing exercise," further negatively describing the work - and its gallery companions in the 1991 Whitney Biennial - as having a "mood of aggressiveness."

References 

Installation_art_works
Conceptual_art
1989_works